Gorenja Dobrava is a small settlement in the Municipality of Trebnje in eastern Slovenia. It lies east of Trebnje, on a road leading north from Dolenja Nemška Vas. The area is part of the historical region of Lower Carniola. The municipality is now included in the Southeast Slovenia Statistical Region.

References

External links
Gorenja Dobrava at Geopedia

Populated places in the Municipality of Trebnje